Charlestown is a ward in the suburban north of the city of Manchester, England. The population of the ward at the 2011 census was 14,332. Voters from this ward elect three councillors to Manchester City Council.

The Ward lies mostly within the lower part of the suburb of Blackley, with Blackley Golf club acting as the ward boundary. Different parts of this ward are represented by different MPs following boundary changes in 2018; the majority of the ward is part of the Blackley and Broughton constituency but a small portion (in Moston) is part of the Manchester Central constituency.

Councillors 
Three councillors serve the ward: Basil Curley (Lab), Hannah Priest (Lab), and Veronica Kirkpatrick (Lab),

 indicates seat up for re-election.
 indicates seat won in by-election.

Elections in 2020s 
* denotes incumbent councillor seeking re-election.

May 2021

Elections in 2010s

May 2019

May 2018

May 2016

May 2015

May 2014

May 2012

May 2011

May 2010

Elections in 2000s

References

Manchester City Council Wards